Henryk IX Starszy (literally Henry IX the Elder) (b. probably between 1387 and 1392, d 11 November 1467 in Krosno) was a Duke of Żagań-Głogów during 1397–1412 (as co-ruler of his brother), during 1412–17 ruler over Szprotawa, Krosno Odrzańskie, Świebodzin and half of Głogów (with his brothers as co-rulers), since 1417 ruler over Szprotawa, half of Głogów, since 1420 ruler over Kożuchów and Zielona Góra, from 1430 ruler over Krosno Odrzańskie and Świebodzin and since 1446 Duke of Lubin.

He was the second son of Henry VIII the Sparrow, Duke of Głogów by his wife Katharina, daughter of Duke Władysław of Opole.

Life
After his father's death in 1397, the Dowager Duchess Katharina moved with their children to Kożuchów, who, together with Zielona Góra, was her dower. Between 1397 and 1401 the official custody of the princes and the regency of the Duchy was held by Duke Rupert I of Legnica. This was a difficult task, since Henryk VIII leave his lands in a difficult financial situation. Rupert I gradually began the payment of Henryk VIII's creditors and improved the general situation of the Duchy. The Regent showed special assistance to the main cities of the Duchy: Głogów, Krosno Odrzańskie and Szprotawa.

After his older brother Jan I attained his majority in 1401, he assumed the guardianship of his younger brothers and assumed the full government of the Duchy. In 1403 the brothers received the lands of their uncle Henry VI the Older after the resignation of his widow Hedwig of Legnica, who ruled them as her dower since 1393. In 1412 was made the formal division of the Duchy: Henry IX, together with his brothers Henry X Rumpold and Wenceslaus obtained the Duchy of Głogów (who included half of Głogów, Świebodzin, Krosno Odrzańskie and Szprotawa).

By 1417 was made a new divisionary treaty, this time in the Duchy of Głogów: Henryk IX and Henryk X Rumpold retained Głogów and Szprotawa, but give to their younger brother Wenceslaus the towns of Świebodzin, Krosno Odrzańskie and Bytnica (those areas returned to him in 1431 after Wenceslaus's death). Henry IX and Henry X Rumpold ruled jointly, but the tasks of government remained in the hands of Henry IX. Henry X Rumpold remains at the service of the Kings of Bohemia and Hungary and the Emperor Sigismund, under whose orders he fought against the Hussites and made diplomatic missions to Denmark, where he died in 1423 shortly before his wedding with a relative of King Eric. Since the death of his brother, Henryk IX ruled the Duchy alone. Previously, he received the towns of Kożuchów and Zielona Góra after the death of his mother in 1420; however, this inheritance wasn't count with the approval of his older brother Jan I and led to short-term war between the sons of Henry VIII. The conflict ended successfully by Henry IX, who could retain the towns (the dispute ultimately was decided by the Elector Rudolf III of Saxony, leaving the two princes with his lands intact).

According to the contemporary chronicles Henryk IX was a mild man, of a peaceful mindsets. In his youth he suggested as Bishop of Wroclaw, but he did not accept. During his government were developed the turbulent Hussite Wars, which included the Duchy of Silesia; however, he managed to maintain the peace over Głogów.

In 1416 Henryk IX was a mediator in a dispute between the sons of Przemyslaus I Noszak, Duke of Cieszyn. In 1420 took place in Wroclaw the great congress of Silesian princes, were Henry IX was also present. The princes paid tribute to Emperor Sigismund. In 1423 Henry IX, together with his brother Jan I, and other Silesian princes took part in the meeting of Preszburg (now Bratislava), where he discussed with the Teutonic Order and the Lusatia cities the further partition of Poland. There was made a special emphasis to waived the politics of King Władysław II Jogaila of Poland, who promoted the Hussites insurgents.

The cooperation with the House of Luxembourg allowed Henryk IX to obtain parts of the inheritance of his maternal grandfather Władysław of Opole; however, the volatility of economic and the subordination of Dukes Bernard of Niedmolin (Falkenberg) and Bolko IV of Opole ultimately convinced the Emperor on 16 September 1435 to confirm the favorable ruling to the Dukes of Opole after an arbitration made in Prague on 2 July 1417, who obliged Henryk IX to return to the Dukes of Opole the lands taken by him.

In the first months of 1425 began to organize the Hussite retaliatory expedition to Silesia. The reaction of the Silesian rulers was different: some of them passed by on the Hussites (like Bolko V the Hussite), while others fight against them, like Henry IX. The entry of the Hussite troops to the Duchy Głogów caused great destruction. Henry IX seek the assistance of the Polish King Wladyslaw II Jogaila. In return for the King's protection against the Hussites, he promised named him his heir, but these efforts have produced no major results. In 1431, during the subsequent Hussite invasion, Henryk IX was able to repelled them. In 1433, together with troops from Poland and the Teutonic Order, he took part in the war against the Hussites.

During the next war against Bohemia during 1438-1439 Henryk IX supported Albert V of Habsburg, and on 3 December 1438 he paid homage to him. At the beginning of the following year he managed to repelled the Greater Poland troops at the crossings of the Odra River despite his much smaller forces.

The reputation of Henryk IX in Silesia was an enormous; for example, in September 1444 the Duke was a mediator in the conflict between the Dukes of Oleśnica. Two years later, in 1446, he could take control over Lubin, when his rulers, the Dukes Jan I and Henryk X pledged this land to him.

On 19 April 1458 Henry IX acceded to preside the association of Silesian princes and cities against George of Poděbrady the new King of Bohemia. However, after the general recognition of the new Bohemian ruler the next year, he finally paid homage to him in Świdnica. This step was followed by the formal investiture to King George of the Duchy of Opole on 26 October 1463. However, in view of the strong resistance of both Dukes Henry IX and Nicholas I, the King finally decided to make a compromise on 29 April 1464, under which he waived all his claims over Opole in return for 14,000 pieces of gold.

During his reign, Głogów was the witness of important events: on 17 May 1462 took place in the city the meeting between King Casimir IV of Poland and King George of Bohemia. They accorded there that, after George's death, the Bohemian throne could passed to Casimir IV's son. During this important meeting was also discussed the disputes between Poland and the Duchy of Głogów. Any dispute between them was resolved after further congress in Babimost and Gościkowo (Paradyż).

Despite the fruitful cooperation with the Bohemian King, on 23 December Henry IX was excommunicated by the Pope for accepted the nomination of the Polish prince as heir of Bohemia.

At the end of his reign, Henryk IX concentrated all his energy in his war against his nephew Jan II the Mad, in order to restore the Duchy of Żagań to his eldest nephew and Jan II's brother, Balthasar.

In the present, were little information of the government activities of Henryk IX. However, in Głogów was founded new laws, judicial orders, etc. created by him. During this time, the financial problems continued.

Henryk died on 11 November 1467 in Krosno Odrzańskie and was buried in the chapel of the missionaries of Kożuchów.

Marriage and issue
By 1432, probably no later than 1423, Henryk IX married with Jadwiga (died by 25 June 1447 – 1453), daughter of Konrad III the Old, Duke of Oleśnica.

They had six children:
Zygmunt (born 1431 or 1432 – died 24 December 1458).
Henryk XI (after 1428 – died 22 February 1476).
Anna (born probably 1430-1440 – died 17 December 1483), married in 1454 Jan II of Rosenberg.
A son (born before 30 May 1447 – died before 11 November 1467).
Hedwig (born c. 1450 – died by 30 May 1482).
Katharina (born before 1454 – died after 14 November 1497).

In a will written in 1447 he left the Duchy to his three sons as co-rulers. In the testament was an entry who expressed the wish that the Duchy was not divided for 20 years. His heirs weren't allowed to consult foreign advisers. This was to ensure the unify of Głogów. However, the early death of two of his sons prevented the danger of further divisions, and all the Duchy of Głogów passed to his only surviving son, Henry XI, the last male member of his line.

Footnotes

References

Genealogical database by Herbert Stoyan
This article was translated from his original in Polish Wikipedia.

|-

|-

1380s births
1467 deaths
People excommunicated by the Catholic Church
Piast dynasty
Medieval nobility of the Holy Roman Empire
14th-century Polish people
15th-century Polish people